Donald Fletcher (born March 28, 1931) was a Canadian ice hockey player with the Trail Smoke Eaters. He won a gold medal at the 1961 World Ice Hockey Championships in Switzerland. He also played for the Regina Caps, Moose Jaw Canucks, Springfield Indians, Moose Jaw Millers, Rossland Warriors, and Seattle Totems.

References

1931 births
Living people
Canadian ice hockey defencemen
Ice hockey people from Calgary
Springfield Indians players